James Chance and the Contortions (initially known simply as Contortions, a spin-off group is called James White and the Blacks) was a musical group led by saxophonist and vocalist James Chance, formed in 1977. They were a central act of New York City's downtown no wave music scene in the late 1970s, and were featured on the influential compilation No New York (1978).

Recording history
Their first recording, credited solely as Contortions, was on the 1978 compilation, No New York, produced by Brian Eno. The following year, two albums were issued almost simultaneously on ZE Records; Buy and Off White under the moniker James White and the Blacks. The same musicians recorded both records, though none are credited on the album cover. The Contortions appeared in Rosa von Praunheim's film Das Todesmagazin in 1979.

In 2016, Chance released his first single with his original Contortions band in nearly 30 years, entitled "Melt Yourself Down". A music video for the single was directed, filmed and animated by 19 year old Dylan Greenberg and is considered the first Contortions music video to make significant use of dramatic digital effects, such as Chance's face being manipulated to appear as if it were melting.

Band members
Original Contortions guitarist Pat Place went on to found the group Bush Tetras. Georges Scott played with Lydia Lunch and Michael Paumgarten in 8-Eyed Spy. Shortly thereafter, guitarist Jody Harris formed Raybeats with Don Christensen, George Scott III and Pat Irwin. Keyboardist Adele Bertei formed the Bloods, after which she released a solo record, Little Lives, in 1988. In 1979 George Scott toured with John Cale, as documented on the album Sabotage Live. Scott died of a heroin overdose on August 5, 1980. Steven Kramer played organ and percussion in the second incarnation of the Contortions in 1979-80. Some of the members of James White and the Blacks, notably Joseph Bowie, separated from Chance and formed the band Defunkt.

On November 30, 2010 James Chance, Pat Place, Don Christensen, Jody Harris, Adele Bertei, and Robert Aaron reunited as James Chance and the Contortions at Le Poisson Rouge for a single performance. Robert Aaron was not an original member but frequently collaborated with Chance.

Discography
 No New York (1978) (compilation contribution, as Contortions)
 Buy (1979) (as Contortions)
 Live aux Bains Douches (1980)
 Live in New York (1981)
 Soul Exorcism (1991)
 Lost Chance (1995)
 Molotov Cocktail Lounge (Enemy, 1996)
 White Cannibal (2000)
 The Flesh is Weak (2016)

References

Bibliography
Carlo McCormick, The Downtown Book: The New York Art Scene, 1974–1984, Princeton University Press, 2006
 Marc Masters, No Wave, London: Black Dog Publishing, 2007

External links
"X-Magazine Benefit" by Coleen Fitzgibbon and Alan W. Moore 1978/2009, video, 11 minutes of Colab's X Magazine Benefit that documents the punk rock performances of James Chance and the Contortions, DNA and Boris Policeband
James Chance & the Contortions played LPR (pics & video)

No wave groups
American sound artists
American experimental musicians
American noise rock music groups
Musical groups from New York City
ROIR artists
American jazz ensembles from New York City
Free jazz ensembles
Punk rock groups from New York (state)
American experimental musical groups
American post-punk music groups
Musical groups established in 1977
Jazz musicians from New York (state)
Enemy Records artists
ZE Records artists